This is a list of the Bulgaria national football team results from 2020 to present.

Results

2020

2021

2022

Forthcoming fixtures
The following matches are scheduled:

Notes

References

External links

Bulgaria national football team results
2020s in Bulgaria